Puducherry Technological University (PTU, French: Université technologique de Pondichéry), is the first state Public technical and research university of the Union Territory of Puducherry which has been constituted by upgrading Pondicherry Engineering College (PEC) with the approval of University Grants Commission (India). PTU was inaugurated by Hon'ble Vice President of India, on 13.09.2021. The University was established as a Government Funded Technical institute(Gfti's) in 1984 by The Ministry of Education(MoE), Government of India under the Seventh Five Year Plan to meet the requirement of an engineering institution in the Union Territory of Puducherry. 

Nine UG and Thirteen PG programs in core engineering disciplines besides MCA and Ph.D. programs in all engineering disciplines and basic sciences are currently offered in the university. The college enjoys significant autonomy for administration.

Location 
The campus is situated at Pillaichavady, which is about 12kms from the railway station and bus-stand in Pondicherry. It is about 150km south of Chennai (Madras) on the shores of Bay of Bengal.

Campus 
The  of the campus has departmental buildings, an auditorium, library, hostels, students' amenities centre, open-air theatre, residential quarters for staff and laid out with roads, lawns and gardens. A central library with over 48000 books, 72 national journals, 98 international journals and INDEST (Indian National Digital Library of Science and Technology) facility is available for the use of staff and students.

Besides this there is a well furnished guest house and a well equipped dispensary are available. a well planned fibre-optical campus network with 12 Mbit/s leased line internet connectivity is available in the campus.

The institute has 2 basketball courts, one football ground and one cricket ground.

Departments

There are 12 departments:
Department of Electronics and Communication Engineering
Department of Electrical and Electronics Engineering
Department of Computer Science and Engineering
Department of Information Technology
Department of Electronics and Instrumentation Engineering
Department of Chemical Engineering
Department of Mechanical Engineering
Department of Civil Engineering
Department of Mathematics
Department of Physics
Department of Chemistry
Department of Humanities and Social Sciences
Department of Mechatronics
Department of Management studies Innovation Entrepreneurship and Venture and International Business

Constituent and Affiliated Colleges
Perunthalaivar Kamarajar Institute of Engineering and Technology, Karaikal
Women’s Engineering College, Puducherry

Student life

Students' Councils
Each department has its own students' council organising various conferences, workshops and seminars on the cutting-edge technologies, to teach students the latest trends in their field. The councils also encourage students to conduct various online and offline events to help them network with staff and fellow students.

Cybyrus
Cybyrus is a symposium conducted by student's council of the computer science department. Cybyrus 2k20 was conducted with the participation of more than 1000 students from different colleges.

Revelation
Revelation is a Quadrennial Technical festival of the department of Electronics and Instrumentation Engineering, managed by the student council of EIE, fusion. It showcased various creative and technical ideas of students from all over India.

Genesis

Genesis is a Quadrennial technical festival organised by students of the electronics and communication engineering department of PEC. A wide range of competitions, workshops and events are organised once every 4 years to familiarize students with new technologies. The latest version of Genesis was named Genesis 2K19 featured a paper presentation competition, robot wars, a technical quiz, a poster presentation, and a design competition. It also hosted a technical workshop on Robotics which was a grand workshop in which students from all over Tamil Nadu participated.

Intronix

Intronix is an annual inter collegiate technical festival organised by students of the electronics and instrumentation engineering department of PEC. The fest was launched to encourage interest in robotics and technology. A wide range of competitions, workshops and events are organised every year to familiarize students with new technologies.

Marakriti

Marakriti (robot in Sanskrit), the school's robotics club, was started on the year 2009. The goal of Marakrithi is to boost interest in the cross discipline areas of robotics, including mechanical engineering, electronics, and software development.

Mechnium
Mechnium is a Quadrennial Technical festival organised by the students of the Mechanical Engineering department on behalf of the Department of Mechanical Engineering. The latest version of Mechnium was named Mechnium 2K18. It hosted more than 500 participants from more than 100 colleges. MECHNIUM 2K18 featured a paper presentation competition, robo wars, a technical quiz, a poster presentation, and a design competition. It also hosted a technical workshop on the latest topics of mechanical engineering.

Training and Placement Centre (TNP)
Training and Placement Centre of PTU actively involved in preparing the students to fit them according to the needs of companies. 1 year extensive training in Aptitude, Technical and Coding (Basic and Advanced) are provided to all the students.

PEC Alumni Association (PECAA)

The Alumni Association is formed to provide a forum for the students who have graduated to keep in touch with each other and with the Alma Mater. The membership is open to all graduates. It is obligatory for every student to become a life member of the association by payment of Rs.100 at the time of admission. The faculty is its honorary members. An Executive Committee elected by the General Body at its annual meeting manages the office of the Alumni Association.

Rankings

Pondicherry Engineering College was ranked 122 among engineering colleges by the National Institutional Ranking Framework (NIRF) in 2020.

See also
NIT Puducherry
Pondicherry University 
Jawaharlal Institute of Postgraduate Medical Education and Research
Perunthalaivar Kamarajar Institute of Engineering and Technology

References

External links

 
 Google Apps for PEC Faculty/Students 

Engineering colleges in Puducherry
All India Council for Technical Education
Universities and colleges in Pondicherry (city)
Educational institutions established in 1984
1984 establishments in Pondicherry